Alfred Jeanroy (5 July 1859 – 13 March 1953) was a French linguist. 

Jeanroy was a leading scholar studying troubadour poetry, publishing over 600 works. He established an influential view of the second generation of troubadours divided into two camps: “idealists” (e.g. Jaufre Rudel, Ebles de Ventadorn) and “realists” (e.g. Marcabru).

Selected works 
 1893: Mystères provençaux du quinzième siècle, publié avec une introduction et un glossaire par A. Jeanroy et H. Teulié, Toulouse, Privat.
 1913: Les chansons de Guillaume IX, duc d’Aquitaine: (1071–1127), Paris, Champion.
 1914: Les Joies du Gai Savoir: Recueil de poésies couronnées par le consistoire de la Gaie Science (1324–1484), publ. avec la trad. de J. B. Noulet, rev. et corr.; une introd., des notes et un glossaire, Toulouse, Privat / Paris, Picard.
 1922: Les Poésies de Cercamon, Paris, Champion.
 1924: La geste de Guillaume Fièrebrace et de Rainouart au Tinel, d’après les poèmes des XIIe et XIIIe siècles, de Boccard, Paris.
 1925: Les origines de la poésie lyrique en France au moyen age: études de littérature française et comparée, suivies de textes inédits, Paris: H. Champion, 3.ª ed.
 1927: Anthologie des troubadours, XIIe-XIIIe siècles. Introduction, traductions et notes par Alfred Jeanroy.
 1934: La poésie lyrique des troubadours, Toulouse, Privat / Paris, Didier.
 1945: Histoire sommaire de la poésie occitane. Des origines à la fin du XVIIIe, Toulouse, Privat / Paris, Didier.
 1957: Jongleurs et troubadours gascons des XIIe et XIIIe siècles, Paris, Champion.

Notes

External links 
 Éloge funèbre de M. Alfred Jeanroy on Persée
 Finding aid to Alfred Jeanroy Papers at Columbia University. Rare Book & Manuscript Library.

1859 births
1953 deaths
People from Meuse (department)
École pratique des hautes études alumni
Linguists from France
French philologists
French medievalists
Academic staff of the University of Toulouse
Academic staff of the University of Poitiers
Academic staff of the École pratique des hautes études
Members of the Académie des Inscriptions et Belles-Lettres
Members of the Institute for Catalan Studies
Corresponding Fellows of the Medieval Academy of America